Budō was featured in the Summer Olympic Games demonstration programme in 1964.

This included demonstration of kyūdō, kendo and sumo.  Judo, which is a budo, was part of the regular program.

References

Discontinued sports at the Summer Olympics
Olympics
1964 Summer Olympics events
Olympic demonstration sports
Men's events at the 1964 Summer Olympics